South African Railways and Harbours could refer to:
South African Railways and Harbours Administration
South African Railways and Harbours Union